Magnolia sprengeri, or Sprenger's magnolia, is a species of Magnolia native to China, occurring in Gansu, Henan,   Hubei, Hunan, Shaanxi,  and Sichuan in forests or thickets at 1300–2400 m altitude. Named for Carl Ludwig Sprenger, a botanist of note.

Identification
It is a small deciduous tree, to 20 m in height with pale grayish brown to blackish brown, exfoliating bark. Young twigs are pale yellowish brown. The dark green leaves are obovate, 10–18 cm long and 4.5–10 cm broad, with a 1–3 cm petiole. Fragrant flowers appear before leaves, erect, cup-shaped, 15 cm wide, with 12-14 tepals that are white to rosy-red. The fruit is a cylindric aggregate of follicles 6–18 cm long.

Fossil record
Fossils of Magnolia sprengeri have been described from the fossil flora of Kızılcahamam district in Turkey, which is of early Pliocene age.

Cultivation
It is grown as an ornamental tree for its flowers. Several cultivars have been named, including 'Diva', 'Lanhydrock', and 'Wakehurst'. The cultivars 'Burncoose', 'Copeland Court', and 'Eric Savill' have all won the Royal Horticultural Society's Award of Garden Merit.

The species and its cultivars are hardy to roughly USDA hardiness zone 6. A number of hybrids with other Magnolias have also been developed.

Gallery

References

External links
 Magnolia sprengeri images at the Arnold Arboretum of Harvard University Plant Image Database

sprengeri